American singer Ally Brooke has released eighteen singles (including four as a featured artist) and three promotional singles. In 2012, Brooke auditioned as a solo artist for the second season of The X Factor. After being eliminated as a solo performer, she was brought back into the competition along with four other girls to form the girl group Fifth Harmony. During her time in the group, Brooke and her bandmates released the albums Reflection (2015), 7/27 (2016), and Fifth Harmony (2017).

In June 2017, Brooke was featured on DJ-duo Lost Kings' song "Look at Us Now" with American rapper ASAP Ferg. In January 2018, Brooke collaborated with German DJ Topic for the song "Perfect". She released the song "Vámonos" in November 2018, a collaboration with Kris Kross Amsterdam and rapper Messiah. In December 2018, she released the song "The Truth Is in There", written by Diane Warren, as part of Weight Watchers International's Wellness That Works campaign. 

"Low Key", Brooke's first solo single, was released in January 2019. She released her second single "Lips Don't Lie" in May 2019. The follow-up single, "Higher", with Matoma, was released in September 2019. Her next single "No Good", was released in November 2019. In 2020, Brooke released the singles "Fabulous", "500 Veces" with Messiah, "What Are We Waiting For?" with Afrojack, "Gatekeeper" with Fedde Le Grand, and "Feeling Dynamite" with Joe Stone.

Singles

As lead artist

As featured artist

Promotional singles

Guest appearances

Music videos

References

External links
 
 

Discographies of American artists